The 1889–90 season was the 17th season of competitive football in Scotland.

Honours

Cup honours

National

County

Scotland national team

Notes

References

External links
Scottish Football Historical Archive
Scottish Junior Football Association

 
Seasons in Scottish football